Eupogonius subaeneus is a species of beetle in the family Cerambycidae. It was described by Bates in 1872. It is known from Nicaragua, French Guiana and Colombia.

References 

Beetles described in 1872
Eupogonius